La Fayette Eastman (January 22, 1819 – April 27, 1898) was an American politician who served as a member of the Wisconsin State Assembly.

Early life
Eastman was born in Ellisburg, New York.

Career
A pioneer settler of Plymouth, Wisconsin, Eastman owned two farms and a sawmill in Sheboygan County, Wisconsin, and served as a member of the Wisconsin State Assembly from 1876 to 1880. He previously been a candidate for the Assembly in 1872. Eastman also served as chairman and assessor of Plymouth and was a member of the Sheboygan County Board of Supervisors. He was a Republican.

Personal life 
On May 9, 1848, Eastman married Lydia T. Marsh. They had four children. His brother, Enos Eastman, was a member of the Wisconsin State Senate. Eastman died on April 27, 1898.

References

External links

People from Ellisburg, New York
People from Plymouth, Wisconsin
Republican Party members of the Wisconsin State Assembly
Mayors of places in Wisconsin
Farmers from Wisconsin
Businesspeople from Wisconsin
Businesspeople in timber
1819 births
1898 deaths
Burials in Wisconsin
19th-century American politicians